Eighth Wonder of the World is an unofficial title sometimes given to new buildings, structures, projects, designs or even people that are deemed to be comparable to the seven Wonders of the World.

Candidates for the Eighth Wonder of the World

Natural places
 Burney Falls in California, United States; called so by Theodore Roosevelt
 Deadvlei Clay Pan in Namibia
 Giant's Causeway in County Antrim, Northern Ireland
 Gros Morne National Park in Newfoundland, Canada
 Milford Sound in New Zealand; called so by Rudyard Kipling
 Natural Tunnel, Virginia, United States, so dubbed by William Jennings Bryan
 Niagara Falls, between the province of Ontario, Canada and the state of New York, United States.
 Pink and White Terraces in New Zealand, prior to their wrongly assumed destruction in the 1886 eruption of Mount Tarawera. In 2017 researchers using a lost 1959 survey finally mapped the Pink and White terrace locations.
 Torres del Paine National Park, Chile.
 The great wildebeest migration in the Maasai Mara, Kenya and Serengeti, Tanzania

Pre-1900 creations

 Amber Room in the Catherine Palace near Saint Petersburg, Russia
 Angkor Wat, Cambodia
 Banaue Rice Terraces, Philippines
 Borobudur, in Magelang, Indonesia
 The Citadelle Laferrière, Haiti
 The Eads Bridge, St. Louis, Missouri, United States
 The Erie Canal, New York, United States.
 Monastery of El Escorial, Spain.
 The Forth Railway Bridge in Scotland
 Great Wall of China, China
 The original 1882 Kinzua Viaduct (railway bridge) in Pennsylvania, United States.
 The Leaning Tower of Pisa, Italy
 Machu Picchu, Peru
 The moai statues of Easter Island, Chile
 The Obelisk of Axum, Ethiopia
 The Polhem dry dock, Karlskrona, Sweden
 The rock-hewn churches at Lalibela, Ethiopia (Church of Saint George, Lalibela)
 Royal Palace in Amsterdam, Netherlands
 Sigiriya, Sri Lanka
 Statue of Liberty (Liberty Enlightening the World), New York Harbor, United States
 Stonehenge, England
 The Taj Mahal, India
 Chapel of the Rosario, Puebla City, Mexico
 The Terracotta Army, China
 The original rail-only Victoria Bridge (Montreal), Canada.
Thames Tunnel, London, United Kingdom

Post-1900 creations
 Aswan Dam in Egypt, called as such by Nikita Khrushchev
 Bahá'í terraces, on Mount Carmel, Haifa, Israel.
 Delta Works, the Dutch provinces of Zeeland and South Holland, the Netherlands. The Delta Works has been called one of the Seven Wonders of the Modern World by Quest magazine and the American Society of Civil Engineers, and the "Eighth Wonder of the World" by several other sources.

 Empire State Building, New York City, United States.
George Washington Bridge, New York City, United States
 Great Manmade River in Libya; given the title by Muammar Gaddafi.
 Hibernia Oil Platform, Newfoundland, Canada
 Houston Astrodome, Texas, United States
 Karakoram Highway in Pakistan, and China 
 Palm Islands of Dubai
 Panama Canal, Panama
 Pikeville Cut-Through in Pikeville, Kentucky, United States; given the title by The New York Times.
 Queensway Tunnel, Liverpool, Merseyside, United Kingdom
Rogers Centre, originally named SkyDome, in Toronto, Ontario, Canada
Statue of Unity, Kevadia, India, given the title by Shanghai Cooperation Organization.
 Sydney Opera House in Sydney, Australia; the story of its construction was recounted in the opera The Eighth Wonder
 Thames Barrier, London, United Kingdom.
Three Gorges Dam in Hubei, China
 West Baden Springs Hotel in West Baden Springs, Orange County, Indiana, United States.
West Edmonton Mall in Edmonton, Alberta, Canada.

In fiction
 King Kong, a fictional giant movie monster resembling a colossal gorilla, that has appeared in several movies since 1933. His captor promotes public exhibitions of the caged Kong with the tagline: "Eighth Wonder of the World".
 Similarly, Gorgo, a fictional 65-foot tall dinosaur-like creature captured off the coast of the fictitious Irish isle of Nara Island from the British kaiju film of the same name is promoted as the "8th Wonder of the World" while on display at a circus in London.

See also
 New Seven Wonders of the World
 Wonders of the World
 Andre the Giant (a pro wrestler who was given the nickname 'The 8th Wonder of the world')
 Aishwarya Rai (pageant winner and actress was dubbed as '8th Wonder of the world' )

References

Lists of buildings and structures
8